"So You're the One" is a song written by Alex Kramer, Hy Zaret and Joan Whitney. Recorded in 1940 by Eddy Duchin and his and his Orchestra, it peaked at number six on the Billboard charts.

Vaughn Monroe and his Orchestra also recorded the song in 1940 (Bluebird B-10901).

References

1940 songs
Vaughn Monroe songs
Songs written by Hy Zaret
Songs written by Alex Kramer